Colin McDonald (8 February 1948 – 3 October 2005) was a New Zealand cricketer. He played two first-class matches for Otago in 1968/69.

See also
 List of Otago representative cricketers

References

External links
 

1948 births
2005 deaths
New Zealand cricketers
Otago cricketers
Cricketers from Dunedin